Peter Dailey may refer to:
 Peter H. Dailey (1930–2018), American advertising executive, media strategist and diplomat
 Peter F. Dailey (1868–1908), American burlesque comedian and singer

See also
 Peter Daly (disambiguation)
 Peter Daley (born 1950), American politician